Roxbury Memorial Park is a public park in Beverly Hills, California.

Location
The park is located at 471 South Roxbury Drive in Beverly Hills, California. It is surrounded by Olympic Boulevard, South Roxbury Drive, and South Spalding Drive. It is a few streets away from the Beverly Hills High School.

Facilities
The park is home to two lawn bowling and croquet greens, four tennis courts, basketball courts, children's playgrounds, locker shower rooms and restrooms. 

Since 1999, it has been home to a yellow rose garden in honor of Linda Tallen Kane, wife of David Paul Kane, a Beverly Hills businessman.

In 2013-2014, a new clubhouse known as the Roxbury Park Community Center was constructed. It will be dedicated on June 8, 2014

Beverly Hills Lawn Bowling Club
It is home to the Beverly Hills Lawn Bowling Club founded in 1926. It moved to Roxbury Memorial Park in the 1930s, when the first clubhouse was built. Early players included actors Otto Kruger (1885-1974) and Edward Arnold (1890-1956). Walt Disney (1901-1966) was also a donor and regular player. 

The Walt Disney Masters Singles are held once a year in his honor.

Gallery

References

Parks in Beverly Hills, California
Municipal parks in California
Urban public parks
Croquet in the United States